Mestre is the center and the most populated urban area of the mainland of Venice, part of the territory of the Metropolitan City of Venice, in Veneto, northern Italy.

Mestre may also refer to:

People

Surname
 Alberto Mestre (swimmer, born 1964) (born 1964), former competition swimmer
 Alexis Arias Mestre (born 1969), Cuban rower
 Audrey Mestre (1974-2002), French world record-setting freediver
 Dayaris Mestre Álvarez (born 1986), Cuban judoka 
 Daniel José Pereira Mestre (born 1986), Portuguese professional cyclist
 Francina Díaz Mestre, French-born  catwalk and photographic model
 Goar Mestre (1912-1994),  Cuban-born Argentine businessman
 Gloria Mestre Rodríguez (1928-2012), Mexican dancer, choreographer and actress 
 Indira Mestre (born 1979), retired Cuban female volleyball player
 Jordi Mestre (born 1981), Spanish actor and model
 Josep Fontserè i Mestre (1829-1897), Spanish Catalan architect
 Laura Mestre Hevia (1887–1944), Cuban translator, humanist and writer
 Nito Mestre (born 1952), Argentine musician
 Philippe Mestre (1927-2017), French politician
 Ramón Mestre (1927-2003),  Argentine politician, former Governor of Córdoba 
 Ramón Javier Mestre (born 1987), Argentinian lawyer and politician for the Unión Cívica Radical
 Ricardo Mestre (born 1983), Portuguese professional road bicycle racer
 Sergio Mestre (born 1991), Cuban male track and field athlete
 María Soledad Mestre García (1948-2012), Spanish jurist and politician, member of the Assembly of Madrid
 Sylvana Mestre (born 1956), Spanish former Chairperson of the International Paralympic Committee Alpine Skiing Sport Technical Committee
 Ted Mestre, American football coach
 Víctor Torres Mestre (born 1970), Spanish retired footballer 
 Yagnelis Mestre (born 1983), Cuban judoka

Title
 Mestre Amen Santo, Afro-Brazilian mestre (master) of the acrobatic martial art of capoeira
 Mestre Cobra Mansa (born Cinézio Feliciano Peçanha; 1960), Brazilian master of Capoeira Angola

See also 
 De Mestre